Turkish Wushu Federation (TWF) is the governing body for wushu in Turkey. It aims to govern, encourage and develop the sport for all throughout the country.

History
TWF has been established in 2006. First president of the TWF is Mehmet Zeki Akıncı. TWF is a member of the International Wushu Federation.

The federation organizes the national wushu events, and European and World championships hosted in Turkey.

International organizations in Turkey
 13th European Championships, March 6-13, 2014, Antalya
 1st Mediterranean Championships, November 3-8, 2010, Antalya
 2011 World Championships, Ankara

External links
 Türkiye Wushu Federasyonu official site (Turkish)

Wushu governing bodies
Federation
Wushu
Organizations based in Ankara
Sports organizations established in 2006
2006 establishments in Turkey